Falset can refer to:

 Falset, Tarragona, the principal village of the comarca of the Priorat in Catalonia
 Falset (music), pitch-control of a harmonic of a brass instrument

See also
Falsetto